Argentina has a strong body of national LGBT+ cinema. It is also home to the international LGBT film festival Libercine. Some LGBT+ films from the country have been said to "have created an impact thanks to positive critical reception, and their queer protagonists", with the nation itself in recent years said to have "taken the lead in Latin America in producing provocative films that shed the cliches of so much commercial gay filmmaking in the United States". Deborah Shaw theorises that new forms of co-production and different avenues of funding may be promoting more queer film in Argentina.

Analysis

Homosexuality as social commentary
Rosalind Galt proposes that though new queer Argentine cinema and New Argentine Cinema (NAC) occupy the same time period, they may be distinct; that queer cinema is excluded from the discussion of NAC and "crisis cinema". Galt argues that "queer textuality provides a radical mode of articulating economic refusal", that the extra queer narrative is further subversive against crisis in ways not occupied by NAC, precipitated by creative and cultural differences between queer cinema and other modes of filmmaking.

In his 2016 article, Guillermo Abel Severiche also positions queer Argentine cinema as "[conceptualizing] desire as a means to defy a discourse of power", referring to Plan B when he asserts that "the construction of a (homo)erotic sexual tension questions the validity of sexual categories and/or their very existence", breaking a fixed cultural construct. One way in which this is achieved is the presentation of how the protagonists discover their sexuality, without self-imposing heterosexuality onto themselves or each other.

The idea of critiquing society by empowering characters through queer narratives had been mentioned by Lucía Brackes of Los Andes in 2012, in discussion of the much older 1969 Fuego. Brackes reflects that "Coca is such a whore that she becomes a lesbian, a revolutionary and almost militant idea about the oppressed condition of women."

"Berger shot"

Severiche also writes that director Marco Berger uses cinematographic techniques that result in "a (homo)erotization of the cinematographic image that intends to break the consolidation of heteronormative conceptions of sexuality"; these techniques include what he refers to as the "Berger shot" — "shots that depict a young man's crotch". He notes that the "Berger shot" is an example and an anti-example of the Male Gaze, and can be included in the "queer gaze".

Mark James writes that "Berger's distinctive style [is] both tensely sexual but also sensual and romantic" in how the camera is often "lingering on the parts of gay imagination and sensuality that all gay boys grow up trying to process — the sight of a man's arms, hands, legs, hair… handsome faces and the male body"; the sexuality but also the innocence means that though imagery of the body is not uncommon in film, "Berger works it at a wholly different level", as he intentionally avoids using stereotypical gay imagery in his shots.

The Fujoshi film reviewers look at the 2016 film Taekwondo, which Berger co-directed, identifying how even though it is set in a downtown hotel without homoerotic fighting scenes it shows male physicality with "a lot of physical contact and the bodies (and private parts) detail shots" (sic); the "extraordinary masculinity" is still captured despite its slow and emotional tone.

Films

Though not produced in Argentina, Wong Kar-wai's famous Happy Together is largely set in the country.

The Argentine films La León (2007), Absent (2011) and Brief Story from the Green Planet (2019) won the Teddy for best LGBTQ+ feature at the Berlin Film Festival.

References

 
Cinema